Kettle Creek Reservoir is a reservoir at Kettle Creek State Park in Leidy Township, Clinton County, Pennsylvania in the United States. It is open to some recreational boating, fishing and ice fishing. It was constructed by the U.S. Army Corps of Engineers in 1961. Gas powered motors are prohibited on the reservoir. Motorized boats must be powered by electric motors only. Sailboats, rowboats, canoes, kayaks, and paddleboats are permitted on the waters of the lake. All boats must be properly registered with any state. The swimming area at the lake is on the northern end of the reservoir. Swim at your own risk. Lifeguards are not provided.

Alvin R. Bush Dam on Kettle Creek is an earth and rockfill, flood control dam. This is 92% of the total Kettle Creek drainage area. The dam is named in the honor of former US House Representative for Pennsylvania's 15th District Alvin Ray Bush.

References

Reservoirs in Pennsylvania
Protected areas of Clinton County, Pennsylvania
Bodies of water of Clinton County, Pennsylvania